Irradiated is a 2020 Cambodian documentary film directed by Rithy Panh. It was selected to compete for the Golden Bear in the main competition section at the 70th Berlin International Film Festival.

References

External links
 

2020 films
2020 documentary films
Cambodian documentary films
2020s French-language films
Films directed by Rithy Panh